Joel Gordon Best (born August 21, 1946) is a professor of sociology and criminal justice at the University of Delaware. He specializes in topics such as social problems and deviance. His current research focuses on awards, prizes, and honors in American culture. He is an author of over ten books and dozens of academic articles.

Joel Best earned his M.A. and Ph.D. degrees in sociology from the University of California, Berkeley in 1971. He also earned a second M.A. degree in history from the University of Minnesota. He taught at Concordia College (Moorhead, MN--1969-70), California State University, Fresno (1970-91), and Southern Illinois University at Carbondale (1991–99).

He served as a President of the Midwest Sociological Society and the Society for the Study of Social Problems, and was an editor of the journal Social Problems. When asked about his prolific output, Best responded, “If you write a page per day, or every few days, you will have a book by the end of the year.”

He recently was seen as a source cast member on the critically acclaimed show Adam Ruins Everything.  Best provided evidence supporting the fact that strangers, contrary to popular belief, do not (with a single rare exception of an estranged father-son situation) and have never tampered with or poisoned the candy given to a trick-or-treater as far as records can provide.

Selected publications
Joel Best, Threatened Children (1990); University of Chicago Press
 Joel Best, (ed. with James T. Richardson and David G. Bromley) The Satanism Scare, New York: Aldine de Gruyter, 1991, 
Joel Best, (ed.) Images of Issues (2/e--1995); Aldine de Gruyter
Joel Best, Controlling Vice (1998); Ohio State University Press
Joel Best, Random Violence (1999); University of California Press
Joel Best, Damned Lies and Statistics ( 2001); University of California Press
Joel Best, (ed.) How Claims Spread ( 2001); Aldine de Gruyter
Joel Best, Deviance: Career of a Concept (2004); Wadsworth
Joel Best, More Damned Lies and Statistics (2004); University of California Press.
Joel Best, Flavor of the Month: Why Smart People Fall for Fads (2006); University of California Press.
Joel Best, Stat-Spotting: A Field Guide to Identifying Dubious Data (2008); University of California Press
Joel Best, Everyone's a Winner: Life in Our Congratulatory Culture (2011); University of California Press
Joel Best, The Stupidity Epidemic: Worrying about Students, Schools, and America's Future (2011); Routledge
Joel Best, Social Problems (2/e--2013); Norton

References

External links
Personal homepage
Joel Best's University of Delaware Homepage
 Statistical literacy books (table of contents) and papers.

1946 births
Living people
University of Delaware faculty
American sociologists
UC Berkeley College of Letters and Science alumni
Academic journal editors